Dynoides indicus is a species of isopod in the family Sphaeromatidae. It can be found in the water near Sri Lanka.

References

indicus